North Dayi is one of the constituencies represented in the Parliament of Ghana. It elects one Member of Parliament (MP) by the first past the post system of election. North Dayi is located in the Anfoega district  of the Volta Region of Ghana.

Boundaries
The constituency is located within the former Kpando District of the Volta Region of Ghana. It has the South Dayi constituency to the south and the Hohoe South constituency to the east. The Hohoe North constituency is to the north-east and the Jasikan District to the north.

Members of Parliament

Elections

See also
List of Ghana Parliament constituencies

References 

Adam Carr's Election Archives
Ghana Home Page

Parliamentary constituencies in the Volta Region